The brown smooth-hound (Mustelus henlei) is a houndshark of the family Triakidae. It is found on the continental shelves of the subtropical eastern Pacific, from northern California to the Gulf of California, as well as Ecuador and Peru between latitudes 43° N and 18° S, from the surface to a depth of 200 m. It can grow up to a length of 1 m. The reproduction of this shark is viviparous.

References

Mustelus
Fish described in 1863